The Complete Carl Barks Disney Library is a series of books collecting all of the comic book Donald Duck and Uncle Scrooge stories written and drawn by Carl Barks, originally published between 1942 and Barks' retirement in June 1966. The series was launched in late 2011, and will comprise 6,000 plus pages over roughly 30 200- to 240-page volumes when it is finished.

The Complete Carl Barks Disney Library has been translated and published in Italy, Brazil, Russia, and Germany.

Background
The rights to Barks' works were licensed from Disney by Gemstone Publishing from 2003 until the end of 2008, when they ceased publishing Disney titles. When Fantagraphics Books publisher Gary Groth heard this, he contacted Disney and secured the publishing rights to Floyd Gottfredson's work on the Mickey Mouse comic strip, resulting in the Floyd Gottfredson Library series that began publication in mid-2011. Groth also tried to obtain the publishing rights to Barks' duck stories. Disney at first announced they would publish the stories themselves, but eventually changed their minds and passed the work on to Fantagraphics. In 2014, Fantagraphics also began publishing a companion series, The Don Rosa Library, collecting the Uncle Scrooge and Donald Duck stories written and drawn by Don Rosa.

Format
Barks' duck stories have been reprinted extensively, especially in Europe. Before Fantagraphics there were two complete collections in English published by Another Rainbow. The first was the expensive, scholarly Carl Barks Library (1984–1990) in 30 hardcover volumes collected in ten slipcase volumes with three books in each, which was in black-and-white. The second was Carl Barks Library in Color in softcover album format with modern colouring.

Fantagraphics' 7.5 inches × 10.25 inches (19 cm × 26 cm) hardcover volumes are published in full color, as the stories originally were. When the series is complete, it will represent a chronological collection of Barks' stories. However, the volumes of the stories are being published out of order, starting with the volumes that the publishers believe will attract the most attention, starting with Lost in the Andes!, a volume containing stories from what is considered to be Barks' "peak" period (the late 1940s to the mid-1950s), including the title story "Lost in the Andes", which many fans consider to be representative of Barks' best work, and was Barks' own favorite.

The design work was done by Fantagraphics' lead designer, Jacob Covey. The pages are recolored by Rich Tommaso, using the original comics as a coloring guide, unlike some of Fantagraphics' more scholarly reprints, as the books are aimed at a more general audience than many of Fantagraphics' other offerings, which are often aimed at the comics cognoscenti.

The books are about 240 pages each—about 200 pages of comics, with the remaining pages made up of supplementary material, such as cover reprints and essays.

Restoration

Fantagraphics chose to have the artwork computer-recolored, using the original comics as color guides, rather than reprinting with the original off-register colors as they have in many of their other archival projects.  Colorist Rich Tommaso has stuck closely to the original colors, although muting the originally garish ones somewhat in a concession to modern readers. Sometimes the colors were changed when it was known that Barks hadn't liked them, or when it was felt they could be corrected or improved. Some stories are printed from recently rediscovered original artwork.

Censorship 
Volumes 5-20 were completely uncensored, including the racial caricatures that appeared in the originals that had been retouched in later reprintings. 
The first printing of Volume 21 includes the statement "Some dialogue in this edition has been updated." An example of updated text can be seen in the story "The Lovelorn Fireman" at page 108. However in the second printing (released late 2022, but dated January 2023), the disclaimer regarding altered dialogue is removed, and the original text is restored. The story "The Flying Farm Hand" has been removed from the second printing of Volume 21.
The table of contents in volume 23 includes the statement "The artwork in these comics stories is reproduced here in its entirety as first created in 1959-1960. Some dialog has been modified." Specifically, some dialog concerning Native Americans has been rewritten in the stories "Trail Tycoon" and "The Wax Museum". In the second printing all the original  text is restored.

Recognition

 2013 - The volume Uncle Scrooge: Only a Poor Old Man was nominated for the Eisner Award in the category, "Best Archival Collection/Project - Comic Books".
 2015 - The volume Donald Duck: Trail of the Unicorn was nominated for the Eisner Award in the category, "Best Archival Collection/Project - Comic Books (at least 20 years old)".
 2022 - The volume Uncle Scrooge: Island in the Sky was nominated for the Eisner Award in the category, "Best Archival Collection/Project — Comic Books (at least 20 Years Old)".

Volumes and boxed sets
{| class="wikitable sortable"
|+ style="background-color:#B0C4DE" | Volumes
|-
! style="background-color:#D0E4FE" data-sort-type="number" | Vol.
! style="background-color:#D0E4FE" data-sort-type="number" | Release order & date
! style="background-color:#D0E4FE" | Title figure
! style="background-color:#D0E4FE" | Title
! style="background-color:#D0E4FE" | Period
! style="background-color:#D0E4FE" data-sort-type="number"  | Page count
! style="background-color:#D0E4FE" | ISBN
! style="background-color:#D0E4FE" | Inducks link
|-
|4||25: 2023-10-10||Donald Duck||“Maharajah Donald”||TBA||224||||data-sort-value="04"|CBDL 4
|-
|5||5: 2013-11-10||Donald Duck||“Christmas on Bear Mountain”||1947||210||||data-sort-value="05"|CBDL 5
|-
|6||4: 2013-05-16||Donald Duck||“The Old Castle’s Secret”||1948||226||||data-sort-value="06"|CBDL 6
|-
|7||1: 2011-12-05||Donald Duck||“Lost in the Andes”||1948–1949||250||||data-sort-value="07"|CBDL 7
|-
|8||6: 2014-05-02||Donald Duck||“Trail of the Unicorn”||1949–1950||224||||data-sort-value="08"|CBDL 8
|-
|9||8: 2015-05-15||Donald Duck||“The Pixilated Parrot”||1950||210||||data-sort-value="09"|CBDL 9
|-
|10||10: 2016-05-07||Donald Duck||“Terror of the Beagle Boys”||1951||225||||data-sort-value="10"|CBDL 10
|-
|11||3: 2012-11-07||Donald Duck||“A Christmas For Shacktown”||1951–1952||234||||data-sort-value="11"|CBDL 11
|-
|12||2: 2012-07-17||Uncle Scrooge||“Only a Poor Old Man”||1952–1954||240||||data-sort-value="12"|CBDL 12
|-
|13||9: 2015-10-26||Donald Duck||“Trick or Treat”||1952–1953||236||||data-sort-value="13"|CBDL 13
|-
|14||7: 2014-11-05||Uncle Scrooge||“The Seven Cities of Gold”||1954–1955||244||||data-sort-value="14"|CBDL 14
|-
|15||11: 2016-09-13||Donald Duck||“The Ghost Sheriff of Last Gasp”||1953–1955||242||||data-sort-value="15"|CBDL 15
|-
|16||12: 2017-08-15||Uncle Scrooge||“The Lost Crown of Genghis Khan”||1956–1957||232||||data-sort-value="16"|CBDL 16
|-
|17||13: 2017-09-19||Donald Duck||“Secret of Hondorica”||1955–1956||200||||data-sort-value="17"|CBDL 17
|-
|18||14: 2018-03-27||Donald Duck||“The Lost Peg Leg Mine”||1956–1958||192||||data-sort-value="18"|CBDL 18
|-
|19||15: 2018-09-05||Donald Duck||“The Black Pearls of Tabu Yama”||1957–1958||200||||data-sort-value="19"|CBDL 19
|-
|20||16: 2019-05-21||Uncle Scrooge||“The Mines of King Solomon”||1957–1958||200||||data-sort-value="20"|CBDL 20
|-
|21||17: 2019-10-08||Donald Duck||“Christmas in Duckburg”||1958–1959||200||||data-sort-value="21"|CBDL 21
|-
|22||18: 2020-06-09||Uncle Scrooge||“The Twenty-Four Carat Moon”||1958–1962||200||||data-sort-value="22"|CBDL 22
|-
|23||19: 2020-11-10||Donald Duck||“Under the Polar Ice”||1959–1960||200||||data-sort-value="23"|CBDL 23
|-
|24||20: 2021-03-16||Uncle Scrooge||"Island in the Sky"||1959–1960,1990∗||210||||data-sort-value="24"|CBDL 24
|-
|25||21: 2021-11-16||Donald Duck||"Balloonatics"||1960–1961,1969–1970∗∗||208||||data-sort-value="25"|CBDL 25
|-
|26||22: 2022-05-17||Uncle Scrooge||"The Golden Nugget Boat"||1960–1962||208||||data-sort-value="26"|CBDL 26
|-
|27||23: 2022-09-27||Donald Duck||"Duck Luck"||1960-1961,1971**||202||||data-sort-value="27"|CBDL 27
|-
|28||24: 2023-05-30||Uncle Scrooge||"Cave of Ali Baba"||TBA||208||||data-sort-value="28"|[TBC]
|-
|}

∗ The Pied Piper of Duckburg: pages 1–3 script and pencils by Carl Barks in 1959; pages 4–8 script and finished art by Don Rosa in 1990.
∗∗ Only scripts done by Barks; for Junior Woodchucks stories, art by Daan Jippes.

Box sets

{| class="wikitable sortable"
|+ style="background-color:#B0C4DE" | Boxed sets
|-
! style="background-color:#D0E4FE" data-sort-type="number" | Vol.
! style="background-color:#D0E4FE" data-sort-type="number" | Release order & date
! style="background-color:#D0E4FE" | Title figure
! style="background-color:#D0E4FE" | Title
! style="background-color:#D0E4FE" data-sort-type="number" | Volumes
! style="background-color:#D0E4FE" | ISBN
|-
|N/A||1:  2013-11-10||Donald Duck||"Christmas Treasury Gift Box Set"||data-sort-value="0511"|5 & 11||
|-
|N/A||2:  2014-10-18||Donald Duck||"Lost In The Andes" & "Trail Of The Unicorn"||data-sort-value="0708"|7 & 8||
|-
|N/A||3:  2015-11-23||Uncle Scrooge||"Only A Poor Old Man" & "The Seven Cities Of Gold"||data-sort-value="1214"|12 & 14||
|-
|N/A||4:  2016-09-13||Donald Duck||"Christmas On Bear Mountain" & "The Old Castle's Secret"||data-sort-value="0506"|5 & 6||
|-
|N/A||5:  2017-09-19||Donald Duck||"The Pixilated Parrot" & "Terror of The Beagle Boys"||data-sort-value="0910"|9 & 10||
|-
|N/A||6:  2018-09-25||Donald Duck||"A Christmas for Shacktown" & "Trick or Treat"||data-sort-value="1113"|11 & 13||
|-
|N/A||7:  2019-10-15||Donald Duck||"The Ghost Sheriff of Last Gasp" & "Secret of Hondorica"||data-sort-value="1517"|15 & 17||
|-
|N/A||8:  2020-10-20||Donald Duck||"The Lost Peg Leg Mine" & "The Black Pearls of Tabu Yama"||data-sort-value="1819"|18 & 19||
|-
|N/A||9:  2021-12-07||Uncle Scrooge||"The Lost Crown of Genghis Khan" & "The Mines of King Solomon"||data-sort-value="1819"|16 & 20||
|-
|N/A||10:  2022-10-25||Donald Duck||"Christmas in Duckburg" & "Under the Polar Ice"||data-sort-value="2123"|21 & 23||
|-
|N/A||11:  2023-10-10||Uncle Scrooge||"The Twenty-four Carat Moon" & "Island in the Sky"||data-sort-value="2224"|22 & 24||
|}

Softcovers

Fantagraphics has also published three paperback titles containing selected stories from the hardcover line. In comparison to the full size hardcover series which features stories in Barks' typical four-row format, the paperback line present the material in a two-row format at a page size of 7.3 × 5.5 inches.

 Donald Duck: Ghost of the Grotto, 130 pages, 2014-10-04, 
 Donald Duck: Sheriff of Bullet Valley, 98 pages, 2015-04-10, 
 Donald Duck: The Golden Helmet, 130 pages, 2015-10-03,

Related 

Free Comic Book Day 2012

In 2011 it was announced that Fantagrapics would participate in the Free Comic Book Day promotion campaign in May, 2012. For this occasion they would release a comic book titled, Walt Disney's Donald Duck Family Comics, an issue featuring reprinted duck stories by Carl Barks. The issue contained the three stories: The Round Money Bin, Donald Duck's Worst Nightmare and Somethin' Fishy Here, as well as eight one-page gag comics.

Foreign versions

Brazilian version
The Brazilian version is titled Coleção Carl Barks Definitiva and was initially published by Editora Abril from 2016 to 2018, when the publisher ended its contract with Disney. In November 2019, Panini Comics resumed the collection.

Italian version
Two volumes were published by Rizzoli Lizard in 2012-2013 before being canceled after the second volume.
In November 2019, Panini Comics resumed the collection publishing "Le Storie di Natale di Barks", a box set that is the translation of the first Fantagraphics box set with volumes 5 and 11. In November 2022 Panini continued with volume 6.

Box sets

Russian version

The Russian version is titled Библиотека Карла Баркса and is published by АСТ since 2017.

German version
The German version is titled Onkel Dagobert und Donald Duck von Carl Barks and started November 2022. It is published by Egmont Comic Collection.

See also

The Carl Barks Library
The Carl Barks Collection
List of Disney comics by Carl Barks
The Don Rosa Library
Walt Disney's Mickey Mouse (aka The Floyd Gottfredson Library)

References

External links
Fantagraphics Books - Walt Disney's Donald Duck - The Complete Carl Barks Library
Preview - Donald Duck: Christmas on Bear Mountain
Preview - Donald Duck: The Old Castle's Secret
Preview - Donald Duck: Trail of the Unicorn
Preview - Donald Duck: The Pixilated Parrot
Preview - Donald Duck: Terror of the Beagle Boys
Preview - Donald Duck: Trick or Treat
Preview - Uncle Scrooge: The Seven Cities of Gold

Donald Duck
Donald Duck comics by Carl Barks
Donald Duck comics
Comic book collection books
Fantagraphics titles
American comics
Disney comics titles